All Rights Reserved is a 1935 comedy play by the British writer N.C. Hunter.

It was first performed at the King's Theatre in Hammersmith. It then transferred to the Criterion Theatre, where it ran for 86 performances between 30 April and 13 July 1935. The cast included Nora Swinburne, Ronald Squire, Edmund Breon and Esma Cannon.

References

Bibliography
 Wearing, J.P. The London Stage 1930-1939: A Calendar of Productions, Performers, and Personnel.  Rowman & Littlefield, 2014.

1935 plays
West End plays
Comedy plays
Plays by N.C. Hunter